General elections were held in Mozambique between 27 and 29 October 1994 to elect a president and the Assembly of the Republic. It was the first time the country had had multi-party elections, as previously FRELIMO had been the sole legal party. Nevertheless, FRELIMO maintained control of the country's political system, winning both elections. Voter turnout for the elections was 88%.

Results

President

Assembly

References

Presidential elections in Mozambique
Elections in Mozambique
Mozambique
1994 in Mozambique
October 1994 events in Africa